Pink: All I Know So Far is a 2021 documentary film centering on American singer-songwriter Pink, directed by Michael Gracey. It was released on Amazon Prime Video on May 21, 2021.

Summary
The film follows Pink on her Beautiful Trauma World Tour, as she balances being a performer with her role as a mother, wife, and boss. It mixes footage from the road, behind the scenes interviews, and personal material. On the tour, Pink played 156 shows in 18 countries. The film is produced by Michael Gracey and Isabella Parish, with Luminaries, Silent House, and Lefty Paw Print.

Release
On March 18, 2021, Amazon Studios announced that the film will be released on Amazon Prime Video on May 21, 2021.

Reception
The review aggregator website Rotten Tomatoes surveyed  and, categorizing the reviews as positive or negative, assessed 19 as positive and 10 as negative for a 66% rating. Reviewing the film for The Hollywood Reporter, Lovie Gyarkye described the film as "an endearing — if not fully revealing — love letter to family and fans". In a less favorable review for The Guardian, Phil Hoad said of the film: "There is little narrative... and, more crucially, little conflict, outer or inner."

Martha Sorren of Refinery29 highlighted the role that fathers can share in equal parenting: "That pull between Rock Star Pink and Mom Pink is the focus of the documentary, but it's the quiet, family moments between concert scenes that really make it."

References

External links 
 

2021 films
2021 documentary films
American documentary films
Amazon Studios films
Documentary films about singers
Pink (singer)
Documentary films about women in music
2020s English-language films
2020s American films